Byleth Eisner is a character in Nintendo's Fire Emblem franchise. They first appeared as the player character and main protagonist of Fire Emblem: Three Houses (2019), and have since appeared as a playable character in the crossover games  Fire Emblem Heroes (2017) and Super Smash Bros. Ultimate (2018), being added as a DLC in 2019 and 2020 respectively, and as a recurring antagonist of Fire Emblem Warriors: Three Hopes (2022). In each game, players can choose between a female or male version of the character. The male version of the character also appears in Fire Emblem Engage (2023) as an Emblem alongside other Fire Emblem protagonists.

Byleth is a wandering mercenary who possesses the mysterious Crest of Flames and can wield the powerful ancient weapon known as the Sword of the Creator. In Three Houses, they receive an offer to serve as a professor at the military academy of Garreg Mach Monastery, acting as the leader of one of its classes. Three Hopes is set in an alternative timeline, where Byleth did not become a professor at the academy.

Byleth's first appearance in Three Houses received mixed responses from critics, with criticism directed towards a perceived lack of personality. The decision to add the character to Super Smash Bros. Ultimate was also met with heavy criticism from western fans due to a perceived overabundance of Fire Emblem characters in Super Smash Bros.; they nonetheless became one of the most successful characters in the game's competitive scene, after becoming the main character of MkLeo, the number one Ultimate player in the world.

Appearances

In Fire Emblem: Three Houses
Byleth is a central character whose name and gender can be customized by the player. Byleth serves as a professor at Garreg Mach Monastery. They possess the mysterious Crest of Flames and can wield the Sword of the Creator.

Throughout the game, Byleth's only known relative is their father Jeralt Eisner, a renowned mercenary who once fled Garreg Mach Monastery. It is later revealed that they carry the goddess Sothis within them as a result of Archbishop Rhea's experiments into reawakening her mother. Byleth was the child of Sitri, an artificial "vessel" created to carry the Crest of Flames crest stone. While Sitri was unable to unlock its power, she fell in love with Jeralt on account of her incredible kindness, and had a child. Due to Sitri's secret inhuman nature, the child, Byleth, was stillborn with no heartbeat. As a result, Sitri voluntarily gave the child her crest stone to allow them to live, though at the cost of her own life.

Jeralt, suspicious of Rhea as the cause of Sitri's death, used a fire as cover to escape the monastery. Byleth grew up in Jeralt's care, but they still lacked a pulse. Their lack of emotions was also evidence that they were being kept alive by the crest stone, until such time as the sleeping Sothis made herself known to Byleth, albeit in the underdeveloped form of a young girl. When Byleth attempts to sacrifice their life to save Edelgard from bandits, Sothis grants Byleth the ability to use Divine Pulse, a power that can both stop and turn back time to a limited extent.

Rhea's attempt to resurrect Sothis ultimately never comes to pass. When the villainous mage Solon traps Byleth in an otherwise inescapable void, Sothis is forced to merge her consciousness with Byleth's, making them the Enlightened One and retreating into their subconscious. In most of the game's endings, Byleth retains this divine power and succeeds Rhea as the leader of the Church of Seiros. However, in the game's Crimson Flower route, in which Byleth allies with Edelgard against the Church, Sothis' crest stone is destroyed and Byleth becomes a living mortal for the first time, as well as Edelgard's confidant. Regardless of the ending, Sothis remains permanently merged with Byleth as a shared consciousness.

Byleth also appears in Fire Emblem Heroes.

In Fire Emblem Warriors: Three Hopes
Byleth was later announced to return as a recurring antagonist in Fire Emblem Warriors: Three Hopes, a musou spin-off set in a parallel universe from Three Houses. Much like in Three Houses, the player can freely choose Byleth's name and gender. Should any save data from Three Houses be detected on the player's Nintendo Switch, the name that is entered by default is the last name used in Three Houses. They are a rival to the main protagonist, Shez, who in this timeline ends up being the one that attends Garreg Mach (as a student rather than a teacher) and allies with one of the three lords during the war, while Byleth, Jeralt and their band of mercenaries are hired by one of the opposing sides. Shez also carries a being in their conscious named Arval, who was created by an ancestor of Those Who Slither in the Dark named Epimenides to destroy Sothis. If Shez kills Jeralt, Byleth will allow Sothis to control them to exact vengeance, but Shez kills the both of them and feels regret afterwards. If Shez spares Jeralt and Byleth, they will eventually recruit them in their party. This leads to an additional chapter where Epimenides' consciousness takes control of Arval to force Shez to attempt to assassinate Byleth, but they are stopped by the lord Shez is allied with. Epimenides then transports Shez and the three lords to a void and attempts to kill them there, but they work together to destroy him and escape back to their world.

In other media
Outside of the Fire Emblem series, Byleth is a playable character available as downloadable content in Super Smash Bros. Ultimate, being voiced by Zach Aguilar and Jeannie Tirado.

An amiibo figure of the male Byleth, based on his appearance in Super Smash Bros. Ultimate, has also been released. In addition, a figure of the female Byleth, distributed by Good Smile Company, has also been confirmed for release.

Voice actor controversy
In July 2019, the former voice actor for male Byleth, Chris Niosi, was removed from his role for violating an NDA and discussing his role prior to the game's launch, as well as potentially due to physical and emotional abuse that he admitted to on social media. He was replaced by Zach Aguilar, and his lines re-recorded.

Reception

Fire Emblem: Three Houses 
Byleth has received mixed feedback from critics, with some calling the character lacking in depth. Matthew Zawodniak of Nintendo World Report rated Byleth the worst avatar character in the series, saying that even compared to the other avatars, their lack of customizability "breaks down the illusion that Byleth is a representation of the player". Stating his belief that the "defined" nature of Byleth conflicts with their indeterminate personality, he also criticizes points where the player can only reply with one line of dialogue, noting that not fully voicing Byleth was likely a cost-saving measure. Theo Ciccareli of The Punished Backlog criticized the female version's outfit design. Maddy Myers of Kotaku called it "kind of creepy" how Byleth spied on their students all the time. However, Sisi Jiang of the same publication reacted positively, calling Byleth a "great" example of a nonbinary character, noting that there is no gender select for Byleth, only selecting a "form" (despite the fact that Byleth is clearly described as male or female in the player's roster). She also praised the fact that the player was forced to affirm Byleth's humanity, making them more than just a vehicle for the player's own gameplay experience. Hirun Cryer of USgamer remarked that Cindered Shadows, the DLC story of Fire Emblem: Three Houses, "goes a long way toward helping Byleth feel like a real character with a real arc and not just an avatar". Remarking that Byleth felt more like a tool to help the player connect with the game's world during the main storyline, he noted that the plot about Byleth's mother Sitri allowed Byleth to connect emotionally with someone other than Jeralt.

Super Smash Bros. Ultimate

Announcement and release 
The decision to include Byleth in Super Smash Bros. Ultimate has resulted in some criticism from players. During a June 2021 poll on ResetEra (which took place when the final DLC character had not been revealed), Byleth was voted  the most boring Fighters Pass character in Ultimate with other half of the votes. Ian Walker of Kotaku called the inclusion of Byleth "refreshingly simple", while Tyler Treese of GameRevolution expressed disappointment and called Byleth's addition "boring". Brendan Graeber of IGN called Byleth "A Study in Simplicity", stating that "Byleth has a simple to grasp moveset with some fun small twists that's welcomely easy to learn the ropes with, and their unique approach to directional-based weapons stands out enough to make checking out yet another Fire Emblem hero worth it – even for the skeptics."

Byleth was also met with criticism by Western fans, largely due to several other Fire Emblem characters already playable in the base game. Masahiro Sakurai, the creator and director of the Super Smash Bros. series, agreed that "there are too many Fire Emblem characters", but he also noted that he did not directly select the DLC fighters. To alleviate criticism of another sword-wielding fighter, Sakurai and the development team designed Byleth to utilize the Sword of the Creator alongside the signature regalia of the three house leaders in Fire Emblem: Three Houses: Failnaught (Claude's bow), Areadbhar (Dimitri's lance), and Aymr (Edelgard's axe).

Competitive scene 
Original reception for Byleth in the Super Smash Bros. Ultimate competitive scene was mixed; Inverse commented shortly before the character's release that "It's not looking good for the Fire Emblem: Three Houses protagonist." Despite these early criticisms, Byleth would be picked up by MkLeo, the number one Ultimate player in the world; he first used the character during Grand Finals of the major tournament Frostbite in February 2020, winning the tournament.

Notelist

References

Fictional bisexual females
Fictional bisexual males
Fictional bishops
Fictional clergy
Fictional mercenaries in video games
Fictional professors
Fictional swordfighters in video games
Fictional whip users
Fictional war veterans
Fire Emblem characters
LGBT characters in video games
Nintendo protagonists
Nintendo antagonists
Role-playing video game characters
Super Smash Bros. fighters
Time travelers
Video game characters introduced in 2019
Video game characters of selectable gender
Video game characters who use magic
Fictional avatars
Video game bosses
Fictional defectors